Gibbula fanulum is a species of sea snail, a marine gastropod mollusk in the family Trochidae, the top snails.

Description
The size of the shell varies between 9 mm and 19 mm. The solid, umbilicate or perforate shell has a conical shape. It is whitish, radiately maculated above and dotted beneath with red or rich brown. There are several color mutations. The conical, turreted spire is acuminate and somewhat scalariform. The about 7 whorls are very convex, spirally lirate, and radiately costate above. They are bicarinated at the periphery, and encircled by a deep canal. The convex base of the shell bears about 5 spiral lirae. The oblique aperture is rounded. The columella is sinuous in the middle (not concave, nor dentate at the base as in Rubritrochus declivis (Forskål, 1775)) and arcuate above. The broad umbilicus is funnel-shaped, or narrow and almost closed,

Distribution
This marine species occurs off Southern Portugal and in the Mediterranean Sea.

References

 Gmelin, J. F. [1791]. Caroli a Linné, systema naturae. Tom. I. Pars VI. – pp. 3021–3910. Lipsiae
 Lamarck ([J.-B. M.] de), 1815–1822: Histoire naturelle des animaux sans vertèbres; Paris [vol. 5: Paris, Deterville/Verdière] [vol. 6 published by the Author] 7 vol. [I molluschi sono compresi nei vol. 5–7. Vol. 5 (Les Conchiferes): 612 pp. [25 luglio 1818]. Vol. 6 (1) (Suite): 343 pp. [1819]. Vol. 6 (2) (Suite): 232 pp. [1822]. Vol. 7: (Suite): 711 pp. (1822)
 Risso A., 1826–1827: Histoire naturelle des principales productions de l'Europe Méridionale et particulièrement de celles des environs de Nice et des Alpes Maritimes; Paris, Levrault Vol. 1: XII + 448 + 1 carta [1826]. Vol. 2: VII + 482 + 8 pl. (fiori) [novembre 1827]. Vol. 3: XVI + 480 + 14 pl. (pesci) [settembre 1827]. Vol. 4: IV + 439 + 12 pl. (molluschi) [novembre 1826]. Vol. 5: VIII + 400 + 10 pl. (altri invertebrati) 
 Bucquoy E., Dautzenberg P. & Dollfus G., 1882–1886: Les mollusques marins du Roussillon. Tome Ier. Gastropodes.; Paris, J.B. Baillière & fils 570 p., 66 pl. [pp. 1–40, pl. 1–5, February 1882; pp. 41–84, pl. 6-10, August 1882; pp. 85–135, pl. 11–15, February 1883; pp. 136–196, pl. 16–20, August 1883; pp. 197–222, pl. 21–25, January 1884; pp. 223–258, pl. 26–30, February 1884; pp. 259–298, pl. 31–35, August 1884; pp. 299–342, pl. 36–40, September 1884; p. 343–386, pl. 41–45, February 1885; p. 387–418, pl. 46–50, August 1885; pp. 419–454, pl. pl. 51–60, January 1886; p. 455–486, pl. 56–60, April 1886; p. 487–570, pl. 61–66, October 1886] 
 Beck L., 1995: Rubritrochus, a new genus name for Gibbula pulcherrima A. Adams 1855 and Gibbula declivis (Forskal 1775); Archiv für Molluskenkunde 124(1–2): 65–85
 Gofas, S.; Le Renard, J.; Bouchet, P. (2001). Mollusca, in: Costello, M.J. et al. (Ed.) (2001). European register of marine species: a check-list of the marine species in Europe and a bibliography of guides to their identification. Collection Patrimoines Naturels, 50: pp. 180–213

External links
 

fanulum
Gastropods described in 1791